Matt Lebofsky is an Oakland, California-based multi-instrumentalist and composer. Growing up in New York he studied piano/composition with Arthur Cunningham from 1978-1988. As a performer/composer he is currently active in several bands such as miRthkon, MoeTar, Secret Chiefs 3, Bodies Floating Ashore, The Fuxedos, Three Piece Combo, Research & Development, Midline Errors, Fuzzy Cousins and JOB. He is also a long-time prolific member of the Immersion Composition Society Origin Lodge. He toured nationally in 2006 as a member of  Faun Fables, and throughout 2000-2001 as a member of Species Being, and released three albums and toured internationally with Mumble & Peg from 1995-2002.

Matt is also a computer programmer, webmaster, and database/systems administrator at the Berkeley SETI Research Center, working with Breakthrough Listen since 2015, and as a core member of the small staff developing/maintaining the world's largest volunteer computing project SETI@home (since its inception at the University of California at Berkeley's Space Sciences Laboratory in 1997). He also works on the open-source general distributed computing engine BOINC, and designed levels for the iPhone video game Tap Tap Revenge.

References

Musicians from California
Computer programmers
Search for extraterrestrial intelligence
Living people
Year of birth missing (living people)